Grasswrens (Amytornis) are a genus of birds in the Australasian wren family, Maluridae.

Taxonomy and systematics 
Amytornis is the only genus classified within the subfamily Amytornithinae, and form a separate clade than the related fairy-wrens and emu-wrens within the family Maluridae. The genus contains thirteen species, many of which are poorly known due to their secretive nature and remote and inaccessible habitat.

Extant species
The genus contains the following species:

Description
They generally have long tails and legs and short wings and are adapted for life foraging on the ground. The bill is typically shorter and narrower than the fairy-wrens and emu-wrens, which reflects the larger part that seeds play in their diet. The plumage of the grasswrens is cryptic, usually red, buff and brown patterned with white and black.

Distribution and habitat
Grasswrens are endemic to Australia. They inhabit remote arid or semi-arid regions of the continent in the interior and north. Species typically occupy small ranges as well. Most species of grasswrens inhabit habitat dominated by spinifex. They are often found in hilly areas dominated by rocks, which provides them with prey as well as shelter, particularly thermal shelter from extremes of heat or cold.

References

 Del Hoyo, J.; Elliot, A. & Christie D. (editors). (2007). Handbook of the Birds of the World. Volume 12: Picathartes to Tits and Chickadees. Lynx Edicions.

External links
 

Maluridae
Bird genera
Taxonomy articles created by Polbot